The Karen National Defence Organisation (KNDO) is one of two military branches of the Karen National Union (KNU), the other being the Karen National Liberation Army (KNLA). The original KNDO fought against the government of Myanmar from 1947 until 1949 as the armed wing of the KNU, until the KNLA was made the official armed wing.

The KNDO closely followed the peace process instigated by the government, starting with the call for a nationwide ceasefire by the Ethnic Armed Organisations (EAOs) in 2011. On 11 October 2015, the KNDO released a statement on the recently signed Nationwide Ceasefire Agreement.

References 

Rebel groups in Myanmar
Guerrilla organizations
Karen people
Paramilitary organisations based in Myanmar
1947 establishments in Burma